Cavia may refer to:
Cavia, a genus in the subfamily Caviinae
Cavia, Province of Burgos, a municipality located in Castile and León, Spain.
Cavia (company), was a Japanese video game developer.
Juan Cavia (1984-), an Argentinian illustrator and art director.
Cavia anolaimae, a guinea pig species from South America.

See also
Calvià, a municipality located in the autonomous community of Balearic Islands, Spain.
Calvia Crispinilla, was a Roman Imperial courtier.